Jesús Peña (born March 8, 1975) is a former relief pitcher in Major League Baseball who played from  through  for the Chicago White Sox (1999–2000) and Boston Red Sox (2000). Listed at 6' 0", 170 lb., he batted and threw left-handed.

A left-handed specialist, Peña posted a 2–1 record with a 5.21 ERA and one save in 48 appearances, giving up 34 runs (27 earned) on 49 hits and 42 walks while striking out 40 in  innings of work.

Peña also played in the Pirates, White Sox, Red Sox, Rangers and Rockies minor league systems from 1995 to 2003. He went 22–41 with a 4.45 ERA and 39 saves in 300 games, including 229 walks, 448 strikeouts, and 481.0 innings pitched.

External links

1975 births
Águilas Cibaeñas players
Birmingham Barons players
Boston Red Sox players
Caffe Danesi Nettuno players
Charlotte Knights players
Chicago White Sox players
Colorado Springs Sky Sox players
Dominican Republic expatriate baseball players in Italy
Dominican Republic expatriate baseball players in the United States
Erie SeaWolves players
Gulf Coast Pirates players
Hickory Crawdads players

Living people
Major League Baseball pitchers
Major League Baseball players from the Dominican Republic
Nettuno Baseball Club players
Oklahoma RedHawks players
Pawtucket Red Sox players
Trenton Thunder players
Tulsa Drillers players
Winston-Salem Warthogs players
Dominican Republic expatriate baseball players in Taiwan
Macoto Gida players
Grosseto Baseball Club players